Manchester Academy is a music venue in Manchester on the University Campus.

Manchester Academy may also refer to:

Manchester Academy, the old name of Harris Manchester College, Oxford
Manchester Academy (secondary school), in inner city Manchester
Manchester Academy of Fine Arts, in Manchester, UK